Pomone was a 40-gun  of the French Navy, built at Genoa for the puppet government of the Ligurian Republic, which was annexed as part of France in June 1805, a month after Pomone was completed.

Capture and fate
Pomone was captured near Corfu during the action of 29 November 1811 and briefly added to the Royal Navy as HMS Ambuscade, although she was never brought into service. She was broken up for material in November 1812 at Woolwich Dockyard.

External links 

 HMS Ambuscade website

Age of Sail frigates of France
Ships built in Genoa
Hortense-class frigates
1805 ships
Captured ships
Frigates of the Royal Navy